The 1969 British League Division Two season was the second season of second tier motorcycle speedway in Great Britain.

Summary
The league expanded from 10 to 16 teams in its second season. Weymouth Eagles dropped out after just one season. The seven new entrants included three newly created teams called the Crewe Kings,  Doncaster Stallions and the Rochester Bombers. The King's Lynn Starlets who were the reserve side of the Stars also entered, along with Ipswich Witches who returned to league action (their first since 1962), the Long Eaton Rangers (formerly the Archers), and the Eastbourne Eagles (first since 1959). The Rochester Bombers team moved to Romford from 10 May, after the local council refused to give permission for racing and became known as the Romford Bombers.

Belle Vue Colts completed the league and cup double, which included retaining their league title. Ken Eyre and Eric Broadbelt were once again instrumental in helping the Colts win again and they were backed up well by Chris Bailey and Bill Moulin.

Final table

British League Division Two Knockout Cup
The 1969 British League Division Two Knockout Cup was the second edition of the Knockout Cup for tier two teams. Belle Vue Colts were the winners of the competition.

First round

Quarter-finals

Semi-finals

Final

First leg

Second leg

Belle Vue Colts were declared Knockout Cup Champions, winning on aggregate 91–65.

Final leading averages

Riders' final averages
Belle Vue Colts

Ken Eyre 9.84 
Eric Broadbelt 9.74 
Chris Bailey 8.25 
Bill Moulin 8.19 
Mike Hiftle 8.00
Ken Moss 7.94 
Steve Waplington 7.94 
Taffy Owen 7.08
Peter Thompson 6.67
Colin Goad 5.17

Berwick

Maury Robinson 9.32
Mark Hall 8.03
Peter Kelly 7.93
Bernie Lagrosse/Roy Williams 6.89
Brian Black 6.12
Ken Omand 4.73
Andy Meldrum 4.60
Ian Paterson 4.19
Terry Holmes 3.53
Alex Nichol 3.43
Grieves Davidson 3.06
Colin Robertson 2.74
Bill Maxwell 1.67

Canterbury

Peter Murray 10.35 
Martyn Piddock 9.80 
Ken Vale 8.71
Graham Miles 6.89
John Hibben 6.57
Barry Thomas 6.03
Jake Rennison 5.33 
Dave Percy 4.69
Jim Crowhurst 4.56
Brian Foote 4.00
Gerald Reardon 3.70
Neville Brice 3.69

Crayford

Geoff Ambrose 10.03
Archie Wilkinson 8.56
Tony Childs 8.24
Chris Harrison 6.51
Mick Steel 6.44
Colin Clark 6.17
Tony Armstrong 5.26
Judd Drew 4.33

Crewe

Geoff Curtis 10.10 
Paul O'Neal 8.88
Barry Meeks 7.56
Ian Bottomley 7.03
Dave Parry 6.76
Peter Seaton 6.46
Colin Tucker 6.34 
Pete Saunders 5.92
Glyn Blackburn 4.14

Doncaster

Terry Shearer 9.68
Dave Baugh 8.76
Guy Hawkes 7.00
Chris Hawkins 6.38
Derek Timms 5.77
Alan Bridgett 5.72
George Devonport 5.22
Doug Wyer 3.82
Stuart Ulph 3.73
Neil Glover 2.18

Eastbourne

Barry Crowson 9.93
Reg Trott 8.70
Alby Golden 7.88
Hugh Saunders 7.00
Dave Jessup 6.62
Derek Cook 5.32
Laurie Sims 4.99
Cec Platt 4.60
John Hedderick 4.15
Tony Hall 4.00
Joe Robson 3.76
Ray Boughtflower 2.67

Ipswich

John Harrhy 7.87 
Pete Bailey 7.74
Ted Spittles 7.61 
Ron Bagley 7.34 
Ernie Baker 6.38
Dennis Wasden 5.30
Neville Slee 4.81
Gil Farmer 4.19
Mike Coomber 4.09
Bernie Aldridge 3.88

King's Lynn

George Barclay 9.18
Ken Vale 7.33
Ian Turner 7.16
Peter Seaton 7.00
Arthur Price 6.57 
Tony Featherstone 5.29
Peter Maxted 5.07
John Ingamells 4.05
Russ Osborne 3.76
John Knock 2.40
Chris Blythe 1.75
Nigel Spindler 1.33

Long Eaton

Tony Lomas 10.49
Geoff Penniket 8.26
Peter Wrathall 7.78
Malcolm Shakespeare 6.88
Glyn Chandler 6.36
Roy Carter 5.57
Pat Adaway 4.98
Peter Gay 4.82
Gil Farmer 4.52
Bernie Hornby 2.13

Middlesbrough
 
Terry Lee 9.28 
Tom Leadbitter 8.97
Roger Mills 7.19
Pete Reading 6.02
Dave Durham 5.43
Bruce Forrester 5.13
Tim Swales 4.75
Paul O'Neal 4.57

Nelson

Murray Burt 8.00
Dave Schofield 8.00
Alan Knapkin 7.25
Stuart Riley 5.71
Sid Sheldrick 5.16
Dai Evans 4.64
Peter Thompson 4.29
Paul Sharples 3.26
Jack Lee 2.76
Dave Beacon 1.83

Plymouth

Colin Sanders 7.17
Bob Coles 6.37
Dave Whittaker 6.18 
Chris Roynon 6.11
Keith Marks 5.24
John Hammond 4.33
Ian Gills 4.21
Clark Facey 2.42

Rayleigh

Graeme Smith 10.74
Laurie Etheridge 8.53
Mike Gardner 7.81
Geoff Maloney 7.43 
Roger Wright 7.28
Dingle Brown 7.17 
Terry Stone 6.18 
Dennis Mannion 5.50
Barry Lee 4.39
Ian Champion 4.25
Bob Newman 3.90

Reading

Mick Bell 9.04
Richard May 7.96
Mike Vernam 7.79
Alan Jackson 7.47
Ian Champion 6.64
Phil Pratt 6.33
Dene Davies 6.18
Bob Tabet 5.46
Bernie Leigh 5.05

Rochester/Romford

Des Lukehurst 11.52
Ross Gilbertson 10.10
Phil Woodcock 9.17 
Brian Davies 7.28
Tony George 5.93
Brian Foote 5.48
Frank Wendon 4.99
Ian Gills 4.64
Charlie Benham 3.40
Chris Yeatman 3.20

See also
List of United Kingdom Speedway League Champions
Knockout Cup (speedway)

References

Speedway British League Division Two / National League